Ivo Nakić (born May 26, 1966) is a Croatian former professional basketball player, who is now a coach.

Personal life 
He lives in Belgrade and works as an agent in Bill Duffy's BDA Sports Management agency.

Ivo Nakić married Zorica Desnica whom was previously engaged to Slobodan "Boba" Živojinović a professional tennis player. They have a son Filip, they split up before getting to the altar. Zorica Desnica and Ivo Nakić later married where they have a son Mario and daughter Iva.

His son Mario is a basketball player.

References

External links
ACB profile

1966 births
Living people
Bàsquet Manresa players
Croatian men's basketball players
Croatian expatriate basketball people in Serbia
Croatian emigrants to Serbia
KK Cibona players
KK Krka players
KK Partizan players
Liga ACB players
Sports agents
Basketball players from Rijeka
Small forwards
KK Kvarner players